Synchronized swimming competitions at the 2008 Summer Olympics in Beijing took place from August 18 to August 23, at the Beijing National Aquatics Center.

Medalists

Schedule 
All times are China Standard Time (UTC+8)

Qualifying criteria

Team

Duet

References
 https://web.archive.org/web/20110714220445/http://2008games.nytimes.com/olympics/results.asp?id=SYW_201100

External links
Synchronized Swimming – Official Results Book

 
2008 Summer Olympics events
2008
2008 in synchronized swimming
Synchronized swimming in China